Ophiodeira is a genus of fungi in the family Halosphaeriaceae. This is a monotypic genus, containing the single species Ophiodeira monosemeia.

References

Microascales
Monotypic Sordariomycetes genera